Darwin Rush James (May 14, 1834 – November 19, 1908) was a U.S. Representative from New York.

Born in Williamsburg, Massachusetts, James pursued an academic course in the Mount Pleasant Boarding School, Amherst, Massachusetts.
He moved with his parents to Williamsburg, New York, in 1847.
He entered the mercantile business in New York City in 1850, became Secretary of the New York Board of Trade and Transportation, and served as Park commissioner of Brooklyn in 1876–1882.

James was elected as a Republican to the Forty-eighth and Forty-ninth Congresses (March 4, 1883 – March 3, 1887) where he became a staunch supporter of free silver.
He declined a renomination to Congress.
He served as chairman of United States Board of Indian Commissioners in 1890.
He served as member of New York Canal Commission in 1898.
He resumed mercantile pursuits.
He died in Brooklyn, New York, November 19, 1908.
He was interred in the City Cemetery, Williamsburg, Massachusetts.

References

External links
"Silver not a local issue". Speech by Hon. Darwin R. James of New York, to Congress (1886).

1834 births
1908 deaths
Republican Party members of the United States House of Representatives from New York (state)
19th-century American politicians